"Happy" is a song originally recorded by British funk band Hi-Tension in 1984, titled as "You Make Me Happy". In 1987, it was covered by Surface from their self-titled album. A hit single, Surface's version reached number 20 on the US Billboard Hot 100 chart and number 16 on the Hot Dance Music/Maxi-Singles Sales chart.
"Happy" was also featured on Surface's album Perfect 10 and was produced by Bernard Jackson, David "Pic" Conley and David Townsend.

Track listing
 Happy
 Let's Try Again

Charts

Year-end charts

MN8 version

"Happy" was recorded by British R&B group MN8, and released in July 1995 as the third single from their debut album, To the Next Level (1995). The song peaked at number eight on the UK Singles Chart, number 33 in Belgium, and number 11 in New Zealand.

The track was also notably remixed by Dalvin DeGrate of Jodeci. MN8's version is notably the highest charting version of the song and is often included in compilations.

Critical reception
In his weekly UK chart commentary, James Masterton described the song as "another immaculate slice of swingbeat pop and another smash hit to boot".

Track listing
 CD 1 / 12"
 "Happy" (Radio Edit) — 4:10
 "Happy" (Jodeci Mix) — 4:11
 "Happy" (2B3 Street Mix) — 5:17
 "I've Got a Little Something for You" (OJI Remix) — 4:12

 CD 2
 "Happy" (Radio Edit) — 4:10
 "Happy" (Dance Mix) — 5:55
 "Happy" (2B3 Pay Black Mix) — 5:17
 "I've Got a Little Something for You" (Bad Boy Main Pass Mix) — 4:17

 Cassette single
 "Happy" (Radio Edit) — 4:10
 "I've Got a Little Something for You" (OJI Remix) — 4:12

Charts

References

Surface (band) songs
Contemporary R&B ballads
1984 singles
1987 singles
1995 singles
MN8 songs
Pauline Henry songs
Songs written by David Conley (musician)
Songs written by Bernard Jackson (singer)
1984 songs
1980s ballads